Jose Luis Lopez (born May 28, 1973) is a Mexican former professional boxer.

Professional career
Lopez turned pro at the age of 15 in 1989 when he defeated Raul Contreras.

Handpicked as an "easy" opponent against then champion Eamonn Loughran in 1996, he knocked down the WBO Welterweight Champion three times and ended up winning by KO in the first round.  After a win over Luis Ramon Campas, he relinquished the title. He then defeated former welterweight champion Jorge Vaca by technical knockout, and on June 7, 1997, he defeated another former welterweight champion Aaron Davis by decision.	

Lopez drew against Ike Quartey in 1997 for the WBA welterweight title, in a fight where he spent most of the rounds languishing on the outside, only to come alive in the late rounds.  Lopez put Quartey down in the 2nd and 11th.  The fight initially awarded to Quartey by MD, changed after error in scoring discovered.  In his last fight before a four year hiatus, he surprisingly lost a championship bout against underdog James Page for the WBA welterweight title in 1998, this despite Page being knocked down in rounds 3 and 9.

See also
List of welterweight boxing champions
List of WBO world champions
List of Mexican boxing world champions

References

External links
 

1973 births
Living people
People from Durango City
Boxers from Durango
World Boxing Organization champions
Mexican male boxers
Welterweight boxers